Maria Ciobanu (born 3 September 1937 in Roșiile) is a Romanian folk singer.  Her repertoire include more than 700 recorded songs for Romanian, Yugoslavian and Holland Record Companies, Romanian Radio and TV...  Some of her famous songs are: „Lie ciocârlie”, „Aurelu’ mamei”, „Doar o mamă poate ști”, „Spune-mi neică-adevărat”, „Cei mai frumoși ani ai mei”, „Ce n-aș da să mai fiu mică”, „Roată, roată...” and so on.  She was married to Romanian singer Ion Dolănescu.

Honours 
 2 "Golden discs"
 2002: Cross of Faithful Service, class III.
 2004: Ordinul Meritul Cultural .
 2014: Order of the Crown of Romania .

References

Bibliography 
 Tiberiu Alexandru, text de prezentare pe coperta LP-ului Dulce floare-i tinerețea (ST-EPE 01954)

External links
 Maria Ciobanu – Ciocârlia Gorjului, 26 februarie 2008, Jurnalul Național
 “Astăzi e ziua ta...”: Maria Ciobanu, 3 septembrie 2008, Roxana Vintila, Jurnalul Național
 Astăzi e ziua ta: Maria Ciobanu, 2 septembrie 2011, Ramona Vintila, Jurnalul Național
 Dumnezeu îi e martor, 30 iunie 2008, Luminita Ciobanu, Jurnalul Național
 Maria Ciobanu: Dolănescu mă bătea și mă înșela!, 3 iunie 2009, Bihoreanul
 Ediție de colecție – Maria Ciobanu, 3 martie 2008, Jurnalul Național
 Debutul, 3 martie 2008, Carmen Anghel, Luminita Ciobanu, Jurnalul Național

1937 births
Living people
Romanian women singers
Romanian folk singers